Clam soup is a soup prepared using clams as a primary ingredient. Clam soup can be prepared as a thin, broth- or cream/milk-based soup and as a thicker, chowder-style soup. In Japan, hot miso soup prepared with clams is believed by some to be a cure for the hangover.

Overview
Clam soup is prepared using clams as a main ingredient. Additional ingredients can include carrot, celery, onion and other vegetables, vegetable broth or stock or other types of broths and stocks (such as fish stock) seasonings and spices, salt and pepper. Fresh or canned clams can be used to prepare the dish. Clam chowder is a well-known clam soup, but not all clam soups are chowders or have the thick consistency that chowders typically possess.

In Japan, hot miso soup with clams is a traditional cure for the hangover. Clams possess high levels of ornithine, an amino acid that some Japanese people believe serves to reduce levels of stress, and "helps improve liver function—including detoxifying harmful substances like alcohol." A canned clam soup product named "Power of 70" claims to cure hangovers.

Varieties

Clam chowder

Clam chowder is a clam soup prepared as a chowder, typically using a cream base. Several varieties of clam chowder exist. Manhattan clam chowder is a tomato-based soup prepared with vegetables and clams, but lacks cream or milk.

Jaecheop-guk

Jaecheop-guk is a clear Korean soup made with small freshwater clams called jaecheop (재첩, Corbicula leana). It is a local specialty of the Gyeongsang Province where jaecheop are harvested, such as the lower reaches of Nakdong River, and river basins around Gimhae, Myeongji, Eumgung, and Hadan counties as well as places near the Suyeong River in Busan and the Seomjin River.

Gallery

See also

 List of clam dishes
 List of fish and seafood soups

References

Further reading
 

Clam dishes
Fish and seafood soups